The Roman Catholic Diocese of Kalibo is a diocese of the Latin Church of the  Roman Catholic Church in the Philippines.

Erected in 1976, the diocese has experienced no jurisdictional changes and is a suffragan of the Archdiocese of Capiz.

The current bishop is Jose Corazon T. Tala-oc, appointed in May 2011 by Pope Benedict XVI.

The Diocese of Kalibo was created on January 17, 1976, and erected on July 15, 1976, a suffragan of the Archdiocese of Capiz. The first bishop was Juan N. Nilmar. The second bishop was Gabriel V. Reyes, installed on January 12, 1993. The third bishop was Jose Romeo O. Lazo, D.D. The fourth and present bishop is Jose Corazon T. Tala- oc, D.D. The diocese comprises the civil province of Aklan, which was separated politically from the province of Capiz in 1956.

Ordinaries

See also

Catholic Church in the Philippines

References

Kalibo
Kalibo
Christian organizations established in 1976
Roman Catholic dioceses and prelatures established in the 20th century
Kalibo
1976 establishments in the Philippines
Religion in Aklan